Foro panarium is an extinct bird of disputed taxonomic status that lived during the early to mid-Eocene around the Ypresian-Lutetian boundary, some 48 million years ago.  F. panarium is known from fossils found in the Green River Formation of Wyoming. 

The taxonomical relations of F. panarium remain unclear. It is sometimes placed in a distinct family Foratidae. It was considered possibly related to cuckoos, turacos and/or the puzzling hoatzin of the Amazon. A phylogenetic analysis conducted by Field & Hsiang (2018) indicated that Foro panarium was a stem-turaco.

References

Bird genera
Eocene birds
Basal Neoaves
Bird enigmatic taxa
Cuculiformes
Opisthocomiformes
Paleogene birds of North America